Abrantes Station is a railway station in Abrantes, Santarém, Portugal.

History 

The station opened on 7 November 1862 and was inaugurated on 5 May 1863, connecting Abrantes and Crato. It was opened by (now defunct) Companhia Real dos Caminhos de Ferro Portugueses, later called Companhia dos Caminhos de Ferro Portugueses.

On 18 March 1873, in order to connect Abrantes Station to Linha da Beira Baixa, plans were made by Joaquim J. de Almeida to connect Abrantes to Monfortinho, right next to the Spanish border. Similar plans were later made on 1 February 1879 by Lourenço de Carvalho (who was the Minister and Secretary of State for Business of Public Works, Commerce and Industry). It was later connected by Covilhã on 6 September 1891.

It was mentioned by Hans Christian Andersen in his book A Visit to Portugal in 1866.

The Linha da Beira Baixa became a line to the Abrantes station at a later time than the Linha do Leste.

Lines 

 Linha da Beira Baixa
 Linha do Leste

Layout 
According to Infraestruturas de Portugal, although it has two platforms with 207 m in length and 70 cm in height, there are three railway tracks with 508, 311, and 271 m in length. Despite its name, it's farther away from the center of Abrantes than the Alferrarede Railway Station.

References

External links 
https://www.cp.pt/passageiros/en/train-times - train times and tickets
Railway stations in Portugal
Railway stations opened in 1862